The International Revolutionary People's Guerrilla Forces (IRPGF) was a collective of anarchist fighters from around the world. Its formation was announced on 31 March 2017. According to the group, their goals were to defend the social revolution in Rojava in northern Syria, and to spread anarchism. The group announced its dissolution on 24 September 2018.

The IRPGF had been part of the International Freedom Battalion since April 2017. Turkish media have described them as a terrorist organization and part of the network of the outlawed Kurdistan Workers' Party.

Affiliation 
The group was a part of the International Freedom Battalion since April 2017, and they are the second anarchist group to join after the Greek unit RUIS. They participate frequently in the campaign activities of the brigade in social networks.

On 29 May, the IRPGF issued a statement in tribute to the commander of the United Freedom Forces Mehmet Kurnaz (Ulaş Bayraktaroglu), who was killed in combat on the Raqqa Front while fighting the Islamic State of Iraq and the Levant. They define him as a true friend of IRPGF. On the 31st of the same month, the IRPGF sent representatives and speakers to the City of Derek (Canton of Cizîrê) at the funeral ceremony to four martyrs of the International Freedom Battalion and the People's Protection Units, Mehmet Kurnaz (Ulaş Bayraktaroglu) commander of the United Freedom Forces, Muzaffer Kandemir (fighter) of the United Freedom Forces, Elî Mihemed Mizil (Şêr Zagros) and Nimet Tûrûg (Baran Cudi) of the People's Protection Units.

Armed struggle and involvement in the Syrian Civil War
Their public presence was confirmed at multiple martyr ceremonies in Rojava over 2017. Having fought along with the three most recent martyrs of the International Freedom Battalion, they were present at the funeral ceremonies for DKP leader and United Freedom Forces (BÖG) commander Ulaş Bayraktaroğlu, Tufan Eroğluer (Hasan Ali) from BÖG and Ayşe Deniz Karacagil (Destan Temmuz) from MLKP.

The Queer Insurrection and Liberation Army 

On 24 July 2017, the IRPGF announced from Raqqa City the formation of The Queer Insurrection and Liberation Army (TQILA), along with a statement explaining the purposes of its formation in which the response to persecution of LGBT persons by ISIL is highlighted as one of the main motivations of the group. The testimonial image of its formation, in which fighters posed alongside a sign with the motto "These faggots kill fascists" and two flags – one belonging to the recent group and an LGBT flag – that was quickly made viral by several western media that, surprised by the unit's creation, echoed the event with large repercussions.

The recent unit, like the rest of the IRPGF, was a member of the International Freedom Battalion, in one of the testimonial photos is sighted Heval Mahirnota, commander of the International Freedom Battalion, and the Marxist-Leninist guerrilla TKP/ML TİKKO, holding the LGBT flag.
Despite being part of the International Freedom Battalion several media erroneously reported that TQILA could be an official unit of the Syrian Democratic Forces which caused confusion. Following the impact of this mistaken information Mustafa Bali, media director of the SDF, denied such information alleging that there is an LGBT brigade within the coalition, but does not deny the existence of the same which, indeed, belongs to the International Freedom Battalion.

Interviews 

The IRPGF has conducted major interviews with Middle East Eye, CrimethInc., Enough is Enough, Insurrection News and Rojava Solidarity NYC

Gallery

See also 
International Brigades
List of armed groups in the Syrian Civil War
People's Protection Units
Peoples' United Revolutionary Movement
List of anarchist organizations
List of guerrilla movements
List of active rebel groups
List of armed groups in the Iraqi Civil War

References

External links
Nace la guerrilla anarquista “IRPGF” en Rojava para luchar por la revolución en Kurdistán y el mundo – Ruptura Colectiva
IRPGF on Twitter
IRPGF on Facebook
iRPGF on archive.org

Anarchism in Syria
Anti-ISIL factions in Syria
Defunct anarchist militant groups
Defunct communist militant groups
Expatriate units and formations in the Syrian civil war
Guerrilla organizations
International Freedom Battalion
International LGBT organizations
LGBT organizations in Syria
Queer organizations
LGBT anarchism
Resistance movements
Revolutionary movements